Pterocerina townsendi is a species of ulidiid or picture-winged fly in the genus Pterocerina of the family Ulidiidae.

References

townsendi
Insects described in 1914